Port Blandford is a town in eastern Newfoundland, Newfoundland and Labrador, Canada. It is in Division No. 7 on Clode Sound. The population in 1940 was 539, and increased to 631 by 1956.

Climate 
Port Blandford has a humid continental climate typical of the island of Newfoundland. It is wet, snowy, highly seasonal and retains warm summers and cold winter nights coupled with relatively mild winter days.

Demographics 

See also
 List of cities and towns in Newfoundland and Labrador

References

External links
Official site of Port Blandford
Port Blandford - Encyclopedia of Newfoundland and Labrador, vol. 4, p. 388-389.

Populated coastal places in Canada
Towns in Newfoundland and Labrador